Colin Campbell im Thurn (1860 - 1941) was Dean of  Glasgow and Galloway from 1921 to 1937.

He was  born in 1860, educated at  Merton College, Oxford;and ordained deacon in 1889, and priest in 1890. After a curacy at St Matthew Glasgow he was Priest in charge at St Mark, Glasgow then Rector of Dumfries until his appointment as Dean.

He died on 19 January 1941.

References

Alumni of Merton College, Oxford
Deans of Glasgow and Galloway
1860 births
1941 deaths